Business (or commercial and industrial) waste – cover the commercial waste and industrial waste types. Generally, businesses are expected to make their own arrangements for the collection, treatment and disposal of their wastes. Waste from smaller shops and trading estates where local authority waste collection agreements are in place will generally be treated as municipal waste. These wastes are also known as industrial wastes and are released in the environment.

See also
Commercial waste
List of waste management companies
List of waste management topics
List of solid waste treatment technologies
List of Superfund sites in the United States
List of topics dealing with environmental issues
Pollution
Superfund

Waste